Jay Pak (Korean name: Pak Dae-sik, Hangul: 박대식; born April 5, 1985), more commonly known by his stage name, Flowsik (Hangul: 플로우식), is a Korean–American rapper and singer. He debuted in 2011 as a member of the hip-hop trio Aziatix. He released his first solo single, "The Calling," in 2015 and was a contestant on the South Korean rap competition TV show Show Me the Money 5 in 2016.

Early life and education 
Flowsik was born in the borough of Queens, New York City, on April 5, 1985. He was interested in music from a young age, and played both the trumpet and baritone horn while growing up. He graduated from Queens College with a degree in English literature in 2008.

Career

2015–present: Solo work

In 2016, he competed on Show Me the Money 5, but was eliminated in the final round.

In November 2017, he collaborated with Teri Miko and Varien on "Wrath of God" on a Spinnin' Records single. In 2018, Flowsik released "All I Need" and "젖어's (Wet)" which are part of a collaboration series with Jessi.

Discography

Singles

Other charted songs

Filmography

Television

Awards

References

External links

1985 births
Living people
South Korean male rappers
South Korean hip hop singers
21st-century South Korean male  singers
Queens College, City University of New York alumni